Friana Kwevira (born 27 May 1998) is a Vanuatuan female Paralympic right arm amputated javelin thrower. She represented Vanuatu at the 2018 Commonwealth Games which is also her first Paralympic related event.

She claimed Vanuatu's first ever Commonwealth Games medal at the Gold Coast Commonwealth Games by clinching an historical bronze medal in the women's javelin throw event with achieving a distance of 26.49m. With this medal achievement, Vanuatu joined two other Pacific nations including Cook Islands and the Solomon Islands for winning their maiden Commonwealth Games medals respectively as the nations ended their medal drought at the 2018 Commonwealth Games.

References 

1998 births
Living people
Vanuatuan female javelin throwers
Javelin throwers with limb difference
Commonwealth Games medallists in athletics
Commonwealth Games bronze medallists for Vanuatu
Athletes (track and field) at the 2018 Commonwealth Games
Medallists at the 2018 Commonwealth Games